Karen Louise Vecchio  (née Martyn; born March 6, 1971) is a Canadian politician who has since 2015 served a Conservative Party Member of Parliament. She serves in the House of Commons, representing the federal electoral ward Elgin—Middlesex—London.

Biography
She was raised in Sparta, Ontario. Prior to her election, Vecchio owned and operated the Coffee Grind coffee shop in London, Ontario, which she eventually sold. She then joined the New Sarum Diner in Central Elgin in a management role.

In 2004, Vecchio started working for then-Member of Parliament for Elgin—Middlesex—London, Joe Preston, eventually becoming his Executive Assistant before being elected herself.

Election results

References

External links

1971 births
Living people
Women members of the House of Commons of Canada
Conservative Party of Canada MPs
Members of the House of Commons of Canada from Ontario
People from Elgin County
University of Western Ontario alumni
Women in Ontario politics
21st-century Canadian politicians
21st-century Canadian women politicians